The red-throated parrotfinch (Erythrura psittacea) is a species of estrildid finch found in New Caledonia. It has an estimated global extent of occurrence of 20,000 to 50,000 km2.

It is found in both subtropical or tropical moist lowland forest and shrubland habitats. The IUCN has classified the species as being of least concern.

References

Species factsheet - BirdLife International
Species profile - Finch Information Center

Birds described in 1789
Taxa named by Johann Friedrich Gmelin
Endemic birds of New Caledonia
Erythrura